OpenBCI is an open-source brain–computer interface platform, created by Joel Murphy and Conor Russomanno, after a successful Kickstarter campaign in late 2013.

OpenBCI boards can be used to measure and record electrical activity produced by the brain (EEG), muscles (EMG), and heart (EKG), and is compatible with standard EEG electrodes. The OpenBCI boards can be used with the open source OpenBCI GUI, or they can be integrated with other open-source EEG signal processing tools.
Edited Creative waddo youtube chanel

Hardware 
The OpenBCI 32-bit board uses the ADS1299, an IC developed by Texas Instruments for biopotential measurements. The OpenBCI uses a microcontroller for on-board processing — the 8bit version (now deprecated) uses an Arduino-compatible ATmega328P IC, while the 32bit board uses a PIC microcontroller — and can write the EEG data to an SD card, or transmit it to software on a computer over a bluetooth link.

In 2015, OpenBCI announced the Ganglion board with a 2nd Kickstarter campaign. It costs $200 and has 4 input channels for measuring EEG, EMG, and EKG, and is also Bluetooth enabled.

Software 

OpenBCI has released an open-source application for use with the OpenBCI, written with Processing. Display and processing software written in NodeJS and Python are also available.

3D Printed Headset 

Design files for a 3D printed headset for pre-production OpenBCI boards have been released on GitHub. The headset, known as the Ultracortex, holds the electrodes in place, and makes it easy to configure their placement using the 10–20 System. A headset design files are available for download from OpenBCI's GitHub account, or the headset can be purchased from the OpenBCI online store. The headsets are manufactured and produced by Voodoo Manufacturing.

Applications 
The OpenBCI has been used to control a HexBug robot using SSVEPs (Steady State Visually Evoked Potentials). Locked in graffiti artist Tempt One has used the OpenBCI and the low-cost Eyewriter eye-tracking system to continue to draw after being diagnosed with the degenerative nerve disorder ALS.

See also 
 List of open-source hardware projects

References

External links 
 

Brain–computer interfacing
Computing input devices
Open hardware electronic devices
Open hardware and software organizations and companies
Electroencephalography
Open science